Hot Springs is a census-designated place (CDP) in Bath County, Virginia, United States. The population as of the 2010 Census was 738.

Hot Springs has several historic resorts, for the springs helped develop Bath County.

History
Since at least the mid 18th century, travelers came to use the springs. Thomas Bullitt built the first inn to accommodate them in 1766 and Dr. Thomas Goode later expanded it. The most prominent modern resort, The Homestead, traces its origin to this inn. Mustoe House, The Yard, Barton Lodge, Switchback School, and Garth Newel are also listed on the National Register of Historic Places.

In 1943, during World War II, The Homestead hosted a United Nations conference which implemented the foundation of Food and Agriculture Organization.

From December 1941 until June 1942, following the United States' entry into World War II, the Homestead served as a high-end internment camp for 785 Japanese diplomats and their families until they could be exchanged through neutral channels for their American counterparts. The diplomats were later transferred to the Greenbrier Hotel in West Virginia.

Climate
Hot springs has a humid continental climate of type (Dfb) bordering on type (Dfa). It also borders on a humid subtropical climate (Cfa).

References

External links

Vine Cottage Inn at Hot Springs
"Taking the Waters: 19th Century Medicinal Springs: Hot Springs." Claude Moore Health Sciences Library, University of Virginia

Census-designated places in Bath County, Virginia
Hot springs of Virginia
Spa towns in the United States
Census-designated places in Virginia
Bodies of water of Bath County, Virginia